Cottage Farm is a historic home located at Fair Haven in Cayuga County, New York.  It was originally built in the late-1830s in the Greek Revival style, and extensively remodeled about 1874 and again in 1910. It is a one-story, frame dwelling, with a central projecting section and low hipped roof.  It features full-width columned verandahs on two sides with Folk Victorian style design elements.  As of 2012, the house was used as a seasonal residence.

It was listed on the National Register of Historic Places in 2012.

References

External links

Houses on the National Register of Historic Places in New York (state)
Greek Revival houses in New York (state)
Victorian architecture in New York (state)
Houses completed in 1835
Buildings and structures in Cayuga County, New York
National Register of Historic Places in Cayuga County, New York